Baiya may refer to:

Baiya Town (柏垭镇), a town in Langzhong, Sichuan, China
Baiya Township, Dêgê County (白垭乡), a township in Dêgê County, Sichuan, China
Baiya Township, Jiange County (柏垭乡), a township in Jiange County, Sichuan, China
 "Baiya", a 2012 song by Delphic

See also
Baiyashi (白牙市), a town in Dong'an County, Hunan, China